Lipan is an extinct Eastern Southern Athabaskan language spoken by the Lipan Apache in northern Mexico, some reservations of New Mexico and parts of southern Texas. Lipan belongs to the Na-Dene languages family and it is closely related to Jicarilla language, which is also part of the Eastern Southern Athabaskan languages.

In 1981, it was reported that in New Mexico there were only 2 or 3 elderly speakers still alive.

Distribution 
In Mexico, Lipan is traditionally spoken in some native communities in the states of Coahuila and Chihuahua: In Coahuila is mainly spoken in Los Lirios and San Antonio de Alanzas in Arteaga Municipality, El Remolino and Zaragoza in Zaragoza Municipality, Sierra de Santa Rosa de Lima and Múzquiz in Múzquiz Municipality and the cities of Sabinas and Saltillo. In Chihuahua is mainly spoken in Ciudad Juarez, the city of Chihuahua and other native towns.

Lipan is spoken in New Mexico in the Mescalero Reservation and in Texas near the Mexico-U.S. border.

Bibliography

 Breuninger, Evelyn; Hugar, Elbys; Lathan, Ellen Ann; & Rushforth, Scott. (1982). Mescalero Apache dictionary. Mescalero, NM: Mescalero Apache Tribe.
 Gatschet, Albert S. [1884]. Lipan words, phrases, and sentences. (Unpublished manuscript No. 81, Bureau of American Ethnology Archives, Smithsonian Institution).
 Gatschet, Albert S. [1885]. Lipan words, clans, and stories. (Unpublished manuscript No. 114, Bureau of American Ethnology Archives, Smithsonian Institution).
 Goddard, Pliny E. [1906]. Lipan texts. (Unpublished manuscript in Archives of Traditional Music, Indiana University, Bloomington.)
 Hoijer, Harry. (n.d.). Lipan texts. (Available from the American Philosophical Society, Chicago.) (Unpublished field notes, includes handwritten transcription and typed versions, 4 texts, one text published as Hoijer 1975).
 Hoijer, Harry.  (1938). The southern Athapaskan languages. American Anthropologist, 40 (1), 75–87.
 Hoijer, Harry.  (1942). Phonetic and phonemic change in the Athapaskan languages. Language, 18 (3), 218–220.
 Hoijer, Harry. (1945). The Apachean verb, part I: Verb structure and pronominal prefixes. International Journal of American Linguistics, 11 (4), 193–203.
 Hoijer, Harry. (1946). The Apachean verb, part II: The prefixes for mode and tense. International Journal of American Linguistics, 12 (1), 1–13.
 Hoijer, Harry. (1946). The Apachean verb, part III: The classifiers. International Journal of American Linguistics, 12 (2), 51–59.
 Hoijer, Harry. (1948). Linguistic and cultural change. Language, 24 (4), 335–345.
 Hoijer, Harry. (1956). Athapaskan kinship systems. American Anthropologist, 58 (2), 309–333.
 Hoijer, Harry. (1956). The chronology of the Athapaskan languages. International Journal of American Linguistics, 22 (4), 219–232.
 Hoijer, Harry. (1975). The history and customs of the Lipan, as told by Augustina Zuazua. Linguistics: An international review, 161, 5-37.
 Jung, Dagmar. (2000). "Word Order in Apache Narratives." In The Athabaskan Languages. (Eds. Fernald, Theodore and Platero, Paul). Oxford: Oxford UP. 92–100.
 Opler, Morris E. (1936). The kinship systems of the southern Athabaskan-speaking tribes. American Anthropologist, 38, 620–633.
 Webster, Anthony. (1999). "Lisandro Mendez’s ‘Coyote and Deer’: On narrative structures, reciprocity, and interactions." American Indian Quarterly. 23(1): 1-24.

References

Apache culture
Indigenous languages of the Southwestern United States
Indigenous languages of the North American Southwest
Southern Athabaskan languages
Indigenous languages of Texas
Indigenous languages of Mexico
Languages of Mexico